The 2013–14 Estonian Cup was the 24th season of the Estonia's most prestigious football knockout tournament. 
Levadia won the competition after they defeated Santos 4–0 in the final. As Levadia had already qualified for UEFA Champions League as reigning Estonian Champion Santos qualified for the first qualifying round of the 2014–15 UEFA Europa League as the cup runners-up.

First round
The draw was made by Estonian Football Association on 18 May 2013, before the 2012–13 final of the same competition. League level of the club in the brackets. Rahvaliiga (RL) is a league organized by Estonian Football Association, but not part of the main league system.

|-
!colspan="3" align="center"|28 May

|-
!colspan="3" align="center"|3 June

|-
!colspan="3" align="center"|4 June

|-
!colspan="3" align="center"|5 June

|-
!colspan="3" align="center"|6 June

|-
!colspan="3" align="center"|8 June

|-
!colspan="3" align="center"|9 June

|-
!colspan="3" align="center"|11 June

|-
!colspan="3" align="center"|12 June

|-
!colspan="3" align="center"|13 June

|-
!colspan="3" align="center"|16 June

|-
!colspan="3" align="center"|18 June

|-
!colspan="3" align="center"|19 June

|-
!colspan="3" align="center"|20 June

|-
!colspan="3" align="center"|26 June

|-
!colspan="3" align="center"|2 July

|}
Notes
Note 1: JK Pärnu-Jaagupi withdrew from the competition.
Note 2: Pirita Reliikvia withdrew from the competition.
Note 3: JK Kose withdrew from the competition.
Note 4: Taebla JK withdrew from the competition.

Byes
These teams were not drawn and secured a place in the second round without playing:
 Meistriliiga (Level 1): Tartu JK Tammeka
 Esiliiga (2): Tallinna FC Puuma, Tallinna FC Flora II
 Esiliiga B (3): –
 II Liiga (4): Tartu JK Welco Elekter, 
 III Liiga (5): FCF Järva-Jaani SK, FC Balteco, SK Tääksi, Saaremaa JK aameraaS, Viimsi MRJK
 IV Liiga (6): IAFA Estonia, FC Haiba, FC Toompea
 Rahvaliiga: FC Smuuli, Kohtla-Nõmme, FC Tartu, JK Väätsa Vald, JK Jalgpallihaigla

Second round
The draw for the second round was made on 14 June. 

!colspan="3" align="center"|1 July

|-
!colspan="3" align="center"|2 July

|-
!colspan="3" align="center"|3 July

|-
!colspan="3" align="center"|4 July

|-
!colspan="3" align="center"|5 July

|-
!colspan="3" align="center"|9 July

 

 
|-
!colspan="3" align="center"|10 July

|-
!colspan="3" align="center"|15 July

|-
!colspan="3" align="center"|16 July

|-
!colspan="3" align="center"|17 July

|-
!colspan="3" align="center"|18 July

|-
!colspan="3" align="center"|20 July

|-
!colspan="3" align="center"|22 July

|-
!colspan="3" align="center"|23 July

|-
!colspan="3" align="center"|24 July

|-
!colspan="3" align="center"|30 July

|-
!colspan="3" align="center"|6 August

|-
!colspan="3" align="center"|13 August

|}
Notes
Note 1: FC Toompea withdrew from the competition.

Third round
The draw for the third round was made on 18 July.

|-
!colspan="3" align="center"|6 August

|-
!colspan="3" align="center"|7 August

|-
!colspan="3" align="center"|8 August

|-
!colspan="3" align="center"|13 August

|-
!colspan="3" align="center"|15 August

|-
!colspan="3" align="center"|20 August

|-
!colspan="3" align="center"|28 August

|-
!colspan="3" align="center"|4 September

|-
!colspan="3" align="center"|11 September

|-
!colspan="3" align="center"|22 October

|}

Fourth round
The draw for the fourth round was made on 15 August.

|-
!colspan="3" align="center"|4 September

|-
!colspan="3" align="center"|11 September

|-
!colspan="3" align="center"|25 September

|-
!colspan="3" align="center"|5 October

|-
!colspan="3" align="center"|16 October

|-
!colspan="3" align="center"|12 November

|}

Quarter-finals
The draw was made on 28 February 2014. Levadia got bye to the semi-finals as the eighth quarter-finalist, Tammeka II, was disbanded after the 2013 league season.

Semi-finals
The draw was made on 17 April 2014.

Final
The final was scheduled to be played on 17 May 2014.

See also
 2013 Meistriliiga
 2013 Esiliiga
 2014 Meistriliiga
 2014 Esiliiga

References

External links
 Official website 

Estonian Cup seasons
Cup
Cup
Estonian